Estigarribia is a surname of Basque origin. Notable people with the surname include:

People - first surname
Antonio de la Cruz Estigarribia, Paraguayan military officer
Carlos Estigarribia, Paraguayan footballer
José Félix Estigarribia, Paraguayan military officer and President
Juan Vicente Estigarribia, Paraguayan physician and naturalist
Julio César Estigarribia, Paraguayan footballer
Richard Estigarribia, Paraguayan footballer
Marcelo Estigarribia, Paraguayan footballer
People - second surname
Celso Yegros Estigarribia, Paraguayan Roman Catholic cleric
José Félix Fernández Estigarribia, Paraguayan diplomat
Bernardino Soto Estigarribia, Paraguayan military officer and minister

See also
Juan Eulogio Estigarribia, a populated place in Caaguazú Department, Paraguay
Mariscal Estigarribia (Asunción), a neighbourhood in Asunción, Paraguay
Mariscal Estigarribia, a populated place in Boquerón Department, Paraguay

Basque-language surnames